Isaac Newton Ragsdale (1859–1937) came to Atlanta in 1880 from Dallas, Georgia. He lived for many years in Oakland City and served as mayor there in 1908 before it was annexed into Atlanta. He was in the livestock business and from 1925 to 1926 he served as a Fulton County Commissioner. His time as its mayor came during a 1929 change to the city charter giving mayors a four-year term which he was the first to serve. In 1929, the Atlanta graft ring scandal broke and Ragsdale did not run for re-election.

1859 births
1937 deaths
Fulton County commissioners
Mayors of Atlanta
People from Dallas, Georgia